Australia competed at the 1978 Commonwealth Games in Edmonton Canada from 3 to 12 August 1978. It was Australia's eleventh appearance at the Commonwealth Games, having competed at every Games since their inception in 1930.

Australia won medals in ten of the eleven sports that it entered.

Medallists
The following Australian competitors won medals at the games.

| style="text-align:left; width:78%; vertical-align:top;"|

| width="22%" align="left" valign="top" |

Officials
General Manager - Les Martyn 
Assistant Manager - James Barry 
Administrative Officer - John Bourke 
Transport Officer - Arthur Tunstall 
Office Assistant - Miriam Fay
Medical: Medical Officer - Dr Anthony Millar, Physiotherapists - Thomas Dobson, Rcahel Kalman, Messeurs - George Saunders
Advance Party - Bill Young, Leslie Dunn, Massue McQuiston, Peggy Tunstall
Attache - Bill Sturgeon 
Section Officials - Athletics Manager - Geoffrey Martin, Assistant Manager - Frederick Napier, Manager Women - Gwen Chester, Athletic Coaches - Francis Day, Norman Osborne ; Badminton Manager - Don Stockins, Basminton Training Co-ordinator - Ian Hutchinson ; Lawn Bowls Manager - Leslie Fynmore; Boxing Manager - Sol Spitanic, Boxing Coach - Paul Thompson ; Cycling Manager - Bernard Sweetman, Track Coach - Alexander Fulcher, Road Coach - Kenneth Trowell ; Gymnastics Manager - Graham Bond, Men's Coach - Barry Cheales, Women's Coach - Ollie Maywald ; Shooting Manager - Newton Thomas ; Training Coordinator - Peter Anderson ; Swimming Manager - Clive Rickards, Manager Women - Joyce Horne, Head Coach - Terry Buck, Coaches - Joe King, Bill Sweetenham, Diving Manager - John Sherry ; Weightlifting Manager - Lyn Jones, Trainer - Paul Coffa ; Wrestling Manager - Geoffrey Jameson ; Coachj - Sam Parker

See also
 Australia at the 1976 Summer Olympics
 Australia at the 1980 Summer Olympics

References

External links
Commonwealth Games Australia Results Database

1978
Nations at the 1978 Commonwealth Games
Commonwealth Games